HMA may refer to:

 Hargrave Military Academy, a boarding school in Chatham, Virginia
 Harvard Musical Association, a private charitable organization
 Hawaiian Mission Academy, a school in Honolulu
 Heads of Medicines Agencies, network of medicines agencies within the European Economic Area
 Health Management Associates (Arkansas company)
 Health Management Associates (Florida company)
 Herd Management Area, area containing wild horses and/or wild burros, managed by the Bureau of Land Management
 High memory area, in DOS computers
 HMA (VPN), a VPN provider
 Honda Manufacturing of Alabama
 Hot-melt adhesive
 Khanty-Mansiysk Airport's IATA airport code

See also
 Her Majesty's Australian Ship, abbreviated to HMAS or HMA Ship